is a rpassenger railway station in the city of Kiryū, Gunma, Japan, operated by the third sector railway company Watarase Keikoku Railway.

Lines

Station layout
The station consists of a single side platform serving traffic in both direction. There is no station building. The station is unattended.

Adjacent stations

History
Undō-kōen Station opened on 29 March 1989.

Passenger statistics
In fiscal 2019, the station was used by an average of 69 passengers daily (boarding passengers only).

Surrounding area
 Kiryū Sports Park

See also
 List of railway stations in Japan

References

External links

 Station information (Watarase Keikoku) 

Railway stations in Gunma Prefecture
Railway stations in Japan opened in 1989
Kiryū, Gunma